is a Japanese television jidaigeki or period drama that was broadcast in 1983 to 1984. It is the 21st in the Hissatsu series. The drama is a sequel to Hissatsu Shigotonin III.

Plot

Cast
Makoto Fujita as Mondo Nakamura
Kunihiko Mitamura as Kazarishokunin no Hide
Kiyoshi Nakajō as Shamisenya no Yuji
Izumi Ayukawa as Nandemoya no Kayo
Ippei Hikaru as Junnosuke Nishi
Isuzu Yamada as Oriku
Kin Sugai as Sen Nakamura
Mari Shiraki as Ritsu Nakamura
Toshio Yamauchi as Chief Constable (Hittōdōshin) Kumagorō Tanaka
Keiko Hayashi as Otami
Sakae Umezu as Tamasuke

References

1983 Japanese television series debuts
1980s drama television series
Jidaigeki television series